Joshua Dürksen (born 27 October 2003) is a Paraguayan-German racing driver currently racing for Arden Motorsport in the Formula Regional European Championship.

Career

Formula 4

2019 
In 2019 Dürksen made his single-seater debut, racing for Mücke Motorsport in the Formula 4 UAE Championship alongside Nico Göhler. He scored his first victory at the first round of the championship at the Dubai Autodrome and won four more races over the course of the campaign. The Paraguayan lost out on the title to Matteo Nannini, finishing 68 points behind his rival.

Dürksen then competed in both the Italian and ADAC Formula 4 championships. Staying on with Mücke Motorsport in Italy and its German offshoot ADAC Berlin-Brandenburg in ADAC F4, the Paraguayan won a race at Vallelunga and finished eighth and eleventh in the championships respectively.

2020 
The following year Dürksen returned to the ADAC Formula 4 Championship on a full-time basis, whilst also racing in three rounds of Italian F4. He won two races in ADAC F4, those being the final race at the first Nürburgring round and the following race at the Hockenheimring, leading to him finishing sixth in the drivers' standings, with six podiums and 191 points. In the Italian championship Dürksen won a race in Austria and placed 13th in the end results.

2021 

The Paraguayan returned to the Italian F4 Championship with BWT Mücke Motorsport in 2019 for his final season in Formula 4. He improved to sixth in the final standings and won two races at the Mugello round.

Dürksen also made a one-off appearance in the third-tier Euroformula Open Championship for Drivex School at the Hungaroring, accomplishing a podium on debut.

Formula Regional European Championship

2022 

Despite initial difficulties to secure the necessary funding, Dürksen was able to make the step up to the Formula Regional European Championship in 2022, partnering fellow Latin Americans Eduardo Barrichello and Noel León at Arden Motorsport. He declared his dream of making it to Formula One was "more alive than ever".

2023 
During the 2023 pre-season, Dürksen joined the Formula Regional Middle East Championship with Hyderabad Blackbirds by MP Motorsport, from the second round onwards.

For his main campaign, Dürksen remained with Arden Motorsport for the 2023 Formula Regional European Championship.

Karting record

Karting career summary

Racing record

Racing career summary 

* Season still in progress.

Complete Italian F4 Championship results 
(key) (Races in bold indicate pole position) (Races in italics indicate fastest lap)

Complete ADAC Formula 4 Championship results 
(key) (Races in bold indicate pole position) (Races in italics indicate fastest lap)

Complete Formula Regional European Championship results 
(key) (Races in bold indicate pole position) (Races in italics indicate fastest lap)

Complete Formula Regional Middle East Championship results
(key) (Races in bold indicate pole position) (Races in italics indicate fastest lap)

 – Driver did not finish the race but was classified, as he completed more than 90% of the race distance.
* Season still in progress.

Notes

References

External links 
 
 

2003 births
Living people
Paraguayan racing drivers
German racing drivers
Mücke Motorsport drivers
Italian F4 Championship drivers
ADAC Formula 4 drivers
Formula Regional European Championship drivers
Arden International drivers
Euroformula Open Championship drivers
Drivex drivers
UAE F4 Championship drivers
MP Motorsport drivers
Sportspeople from Asunción
Formula Regional Middle East Championship drivers